Battle Heights was a notable New Zealand thoroughbred racehorse.

A son of Battle-Waggon from the mare Wuthering Heights, he was foaled in 1967 and was trained throughout his career by Tim Douglas.

Battle Heights started in 115 races and raced until he was 10 years old when he was forced into retirement after breaking down in the 1977 VRC LKS Mackinnon Stakes.

During his career, he raced and won in every season from the age of three until ten and was successful over distances ranging from 1,100m to 3,200m.

He was also second to Rose Mellay in the 1974 Auckland Cup over 3200m.

Battle Heights was later ridden by C.Walsh in the Cullinan spelling paddock in the Western Districts of QLD. Caryl described the horse as still having that zest for racing, and misbehaved quite often. On one occasion Battle Heights was heading for a fence, and Caryl had to take quick action of jumping off before colliding with a fence.

Battle Heights died in 1999 aged 32.

Pedigree

See also

 Thoroughbred racing in New Zealand

References

Cox Plate winners
1967 racehorse births
Thoroughbred family 9-h
Racehorses bred in New Zealand
Racehorses trained in New Zealand
Wellington Cup winners
Sydney Cup winners